Sérgio Faife Matsolo (born 26 April 1970) is a Mozambican former footballer who played as a defender. He made 55 appearances for the Mozambique national team from 1993 to 2008. He was also named in Mozambique's squad for the 1998 African Cup of Nations tournament.

References

External links
 

1970 births
Living people
Sportspeople from Maputo
Mozambican footballers
Association football defenders
Mozambique international footballers
1996 African Cup of Nations players
1998 African Cup of Nations players
Moçambola players
GD Maputo players
CD Costa do Sol players
Clube Ferroviário de Maputo footballers
Clube Ferroviário de Nampula players